Laurent del Colombo (born 27 April 1959) is a French judoka. He competed in the men's open category event at the 1984 Summer Olympics.

References

1959 births
Living people
French male judoka
Olympic judoka of France
Judoka at the 1984 Summer Olympics
Place of birth missing (living people)